Victoria Ayo Macaulay (born 7 August 1990) is a Nigerian-American professional basketball player for the Nigerian women's national team and is a free agent the Women's National Basketball Association (WNBA) and . In both 2015 and 2019 she played for Chicago Sky in the Women's National Basketball Association.

College statistics

Professional career
During her time at the French side Nice, she averaged 15.8 points, 8.6 rebounds and 0.8 rebounds.

WNBA career statistics

Regular season

|-
| style="text-align:left;"| 2015
| style="text-align:left;"| Chicago
| 4 || 0 || 6.3 || .286 || .000 || .000 || 1.0 || 0.0 || 0.5 || 0.3 || 0.8 || 1.0 
|-
| style="text-align:left;"| 2019
| style="text-align:left;"| Chicago
| 5 || 0 || 4.4 || .400 || .000 || 1.000 || 0.8 || 0.0 || 0.4 || 0.2 || 0.0 || 1.2
|-
| style='text-align:left;'| Career
| style='text-align:left;'| 2 years, 1 team
| 9 || 0 || 5.2 || .333 || .000 || 1.000 || 0.9 || 0.0 || 0.4 || 0.2 || 0.3 || 1.1

Nigerian National Team
Macaulay was called up and represented Nigeria at the 2019 FIBA Women's AfroBasket where the team won gold defeating the host Senegal in Dakar. She averaged 6.4 points, 3.4 rebounds and 1.2 assists during the tournament in Dakar. She also participated in the 2020 FIBA Women's Olympic Qualifying Tournaments in Belgrade.

References

1990 births
Living people
American sportspeople of Nigerian descent
American women's basketball players
Basketball players at the 2020 Summer Olympics
Centers (basketball)
Chicago Sky players
Citizens of Nigeria through descent
Galatasaray S.K. (women's basketball) players
Nigerian women's basketball players
Olympiacos Women's Basketball players
Olympic basketball players of Nigeria
Sportspeople from Staten Island
Basketball players from New York City
Temple Owls women's basketball players
Undrafted Women's National Basketball Association players
African-American basketball players
Nigerian people of African-American descent
American emigrants to Nigeria
21st-century African-American sportspeople